South Korea competed at the 2004 Summer Olympics in Athens, from 13 to 29 August 2004. This was the nation's fourteenth appearance at the Olympics, except the 1980 Summer Olympics in Moscow because of its support for the United States boycott. The Korean Olympic Committee sent the nation's smallest delegation to the Games since 1992. A total of 264 athletes, 145 men and 119 women, competed in 25 sports.

South Korea left Athens with a total of 30 medals (9 golds, 12 silver, and 9 bronze), finishing ninth in the overall medal standings. Four of these medals were awarded to the athletes in archery, badminton, and taekwondo (South Korea's traditional sport), and three each in judo, shooting, and table tennis. South Korea's team-based athletes proved successful in Athens as the women's handball team climbed the podium with a silver medal for the second time, following its major setback in Sydney from a fourth-place finish.

Among the nation's medalists were taekwondo jin Moon Dae-sung in the men's super heavyweight division, archer Park Sung-hyun in both women's individual and team event, artistic gymnasts Kim Dae-eun and Yang Tae-young in the men's individual all-around, and trap shooter Lee Bo-Na.

Both North Korea and South Korea marched together in the parade of nations during the opening and closing ceremonies under the Unification Flag, a white flag showing the united Korean Peninsula in blue. They had two flagbearers carrying the flag together at each occasion, one representing the North and the other representing the South. The female athletes and staff wore red blazers, while their male counterparts wore blue. Although they marched together, the teams competed separately and had separate medal tallies.

Medalists

|  style="text-align:left; width:72%; vertical-align:top;"|

| style="text-align:left; width:23%; vertical-align:top;"|

Archery

Three South Korean archers qualified each for the men's and women's individual archery, and a spot each for both men's and women's teams.

Men

Women

Athletics

South Korean athletes have so far achieved qualifying standards in the following athletics events (up to a maximum of 3 athletes in each event at the 'A' Standard, and 1 at the 'B' Standard).

Men
Track & road events

Field events

Women
Track & road events

Field events

Badminton

Men

Women

Mixed

Basketball

Women's tournament

Roster

Group play

Classification match (11th–12th place)

Boxing

South Korea sent seven boxers to Athens.  They returned with two bronze medals, putting them in a four-way tie for 12th place in the boxing medal count.  Three lost their round of 32 bouts, while the other four all won in the round of 16 to advance to the quarterfinals.  Two more fell there, with the remaining two losing in the semifinals to finish with bronze medals.  The combined record of the Korean team was 9-7.

Cycling

Road

Track
Sprint

Keirin

Omnium

Equestrian

Show jumping

Fencing

Twelve South Korean fencers (six men and six women) qualified for the following categories:

Men

Women

Field hockey

Men's tournament

Roster

Group play

5th–8th place match

7th place match

Women's tournament

Roster

Group play

5th–8th place match

7th place match

Football

Men's tournament

Roster

Group play

Quarterfinals

Gymnastics

Artistic
Men
Team

Individual finals

Women

Handball

Men's tournament

Roster

Group play

Quarterfinals

Classification semifinal (5th–8th place)

7th place match

Women's tournament

Roster

Group play

Quarterfinals

Semifinals

Gold medal final

Judo

Thirteen South Korean judoka (seven males and six females) qualified for the 2004 Summer Olympics.

Men

Women

Modern pentathlon

Two South Korean athletes qualified to compete in the modern pentathlon event through the Asian Championships.

Rowing

South Korean rowers qualified the following boats:

Men

Women

Qualification Legend: FA=Final A (medal); FB=Final B (non-medal); FC=Final C (non-medal); FD=Final D (non-medal); FE=Final E (non-medal); FF=Final F (non-medal); SA/B=Semifinals A/B; SC/D=Semifinals C/D; SE/F=Semifinals E/F; R=Repechage

Sailing

South Korean sailors have qualified one boat for each of the following events.

Men

Open

M = Medal race; OCS = On course side of the starting line; DSQ = Disqualified; DNF = Did not finish; DNS= Did not start; RDG = Redress given

Shooting

Sixteen South Korean shooters (seven men and nine women) qualified to compete in the following events:

Men

Women

Swimming

South Korean swimmers earned qualifying standards in the following events (up to a maximum of 2 swimmers in each event at the A-standard time, and 1 at the B-standard time): Nam Yoo-Sun became the first ever South Korean swimmer to reach an Olympic final in the women's 400 m individual medley, setting up a new South Korean record.

Men

Women

Synchronized swimming

Two South Korean synchronized swimmers qualified a spot in the women's duet.

Table tennis

Nine South Korean table tennis players qualified for the following events.

Men

Women

Taekwondo

Four South Korean taekwondo athletes qualified for the following events.

Tennis

South Korea nominated a male and a female tennis player to compete in the tournament.

Volleyball

Women's tournament

Roster

Group play

Quarterfinals

Weightlifting

Eight South Korean weightlifters qualified for the following events:

Men

Women

Wrestling

Men's freestyle

Men's Greco-Roman

Women's freestyle

See also
 South Korea at the 2002 Asian Games
 South Korea at the 2004 Summer Paralympics

References

External links
Official Report of the XXVIII Olympiad
Korean Olympic Committee 

Korea, South
2004
Summer Olympics